Badikaha is a town in northern Ivory Coast. It is a sub-prefecture of Niakaramandougou Department in Hambol Region, Vallée du Bandama District.

Badikaha was a commune until March 2012, when it became one of 1126 communes nationwide that were abolished.

In 2014, the population of the sub-prefecture of Badikaha was 21,441.

Villages
The 11 villages of the sub-prefecture of Badikaha and their population in 2014 are

Notes

Sub-prefectures of Hambol
Former communes of Ivory Coast